Nadan is a 2013 Malayalam drama film.

Nadan may also refer to:

 Nadan, Iran, a village in Sistan and Baluchestan Province
 Nadan (Nadar subcaste), a group from the regions south of the Thamirabarani River in India
 Nadan v The King, a 1926 ruling of the Judicial Committee of the Privy Council in Canada
 Nadan Vidošević (born 1960), Croatian politician, businessman and entrepreneur
 Jambulinga Nadan (fl. 1926–1927), brigand of the southern Madras Presidency
 Nanjil Nadan (born 1947), writer from Tamil Nadu, India

See also
 Bab Nadan, a village in Kerman Province, Iran
 Nadaan (disambiguation)